The Neutral Free Austria Federation (NFÖ) is a political party in Austria founded on 17 March 2003. It contested the 2006 legislative election under the name "EU Withdrawal – Neutral Free Austria" (EU-Austritt – Neutrales Freies Österreich), but only appeared on the ballot in Vorarlberg, Tyrol, Carinthia, Salzburg and Vienna and failed to pass the electoral threshold of 4%, achieving only 0.23%. Its party program is oriented on Christian politics and centered mainly on the demand to withdraw from the European Union and the establishment of direct democracy.  For the EU election 2014, together with the EU Exit Party (EU-Austrittspartei) which has very similar aims, the party formed an electoral platform called EU-STOP.

For the Viennese election 2015, it formed another electoral alliance with the EU Exit Party.

For the legislative election 2017, party leader Rudolf Pomaroli stood on the ballot of the FLÖ.

For the legislative election 2019, the party aimed to participate in an alliance with the Initiative Homeland and Environment as the Öxit Platform for Homeland and Environment, Neutrality and Direct Democracy which but failed to submit enough signatures for a participation. 52 of their collected signatures became stolen.

European Parliament

External links
 Official homepage 

2003 establishments in Austria
Political parties established in 2003
Conservative parties in Austria